The Umbersun is the fourth album by neoclassical band Elend. It is the third and final album in the Officium Tenebrarum trilogy.

Track listing
"Du Tréfonds des Ténèbres" – 10:44
"Melpomene" – 10:26
"Moon of Amber" – 6:12
"Apocalypse" – 9:14
"Umbra" – 8:43
"The Umbersun" – 5:46
"In the Embrasure of Heaven" – 5:53
"The Wake of the Angel" – 4:46
"Au Tréfonds des Ténèbres" – 5:04

Musicians

Sopranos
Tricia Bentley, Hilary Brennan, Rachael Clegg, Bridget Corderoy, Carolynne Cox, Sally Donegani, Alison Eden, Karen Filsell, Claire Hills, Rachel King, Felice Kuin, Wendy Norman, Kathy Willis, Olivia Maffett

Altos
Debbie Bright, Kathryn Cook, Denise Fabb, Victoria Kendall, Katy Meiklejohn, Yvette Miller, Fiona Robinson, Hatty Webb, Lorna Youngs

Basses
Tim Bull, Tim Colbourn, Peter da Costa, Mark Fenton, Michael King

Director
Peter Broadbent

Solo soprano
Nathalie Barbary

Whispered female voice
Alison Eden

All other vocals, instruments, sequencing, programming and sound-editing by Iskandar Hasnawi, Sébastien Roland and Renaud Tschirner.

1998 albums
Elend (band) albums